Barrumbi Kids is an Australian drama television series for children on NITV. It is based on The Barrumbi Kids series of novels by Leonie Norrington.

Synopsis
Through their shared activities, two children learn about the different cultures in their remote Northern Territory community.

Cast
 Nick Bonson as Tomias
 Caitlin Hordern as Dahlia
 Sherona Tiati
 Zeallion Andrew
 Ronon Bonson
 Justine Clarke
 Jacob Junior Nayinggul
 Frances Djulibing
 Adrienne Pickering
 Christopher Sommers 
 Sophie Emberson-Bain
 Finn Treacy
 Serene Yunupingu
 Penelope Thomas
 Stephen Mahy 
 Scott Hall

Production
The series was filmed in Beswick (Wugularr), Barunga, Katherine and Bitter Springs on the lands of the Jawoyn, Dogoman, Wardaman and Mangarrayi peoples.

External links

References

National Indigenous Television original programming
2022 Australian television series debuts
Australian children's television series
Australian drama television series
English-language television shows
Television shows set in the Northern Territory